Cymbidium tigrinum, the tiger-striped Cymbidium, is a species of orchid.

It was first discovered in Nagaland, a hill state in the north-eastern part of India.

tigrinum
Plants described in 1864